Under the Rainbow (released 2012 in Copenhagen, Denmark by Storyville – 101 4287) is a contemporary jazz album by the Danish/Norwegian Dahl/Andersen/Christensen Trio.

Critical reception 

To follow up a success is a difficult task, and Under the Rainbow by Dahl/Andersen/Christensen Trio does not live up to its predecessor. Still a notable album by some of the ultimate jazz musicians of our time. It is always exciting to meet these gentlemen, no matter what context it is in. This trio has constantly had something special about them and it still has.

The review of the Norwegian newspaper Dagbladet awarded the album dice 4, and the review of the Norwegian electronic newspaper Nettavisen awarded the album dice 4.

Track listing 
All compositions by Dahl/Andersen/Christensen except when otherwise noted
"Under the Rainbow #1" (3:31)
"Under the Rainbow #2" (5:14)
"Under the Rainbow #3" (6:27)
"Koloni På Yderkanten" (4:04) - composed by Carsten Dahl
"Under the Rainbow #4" (3:36)
"Under the Rainbow #5" (5:14)
"Under the Rainbow #6" (4:29)
"Two Geese in the Sky" (5:13) - composed by Carsten Dahl
"Under the Rainbow #7" (4:09)
"Under the Rainbow #8" (3:40)

Personnel 
Carsten Dahl - Piano
Arild Andersen - Bass
Jon Christensen - Drums

Credits 
Recording & Mixing – Jan Erik Kongshaug
Pproducer – Carsten Dahl

Notes 
Recorded in Rainbow Studio, Oslo on April 3 & 4, 2013.

References

External links 
Carsten Dahl Official Website
Arild Andersen Official Website

Jazz albums by Norwegian artists
2013 albums